Pyrrharctia genini is a moth in the family Erebidae. It was described by Hubert Robert Debauche in 1938. It is found in Mexico.

References

Moths described in 1938
Spilosomina